The Multicast Routing Daemon v6 (MRD6) is an IPv6 multicast routing daemon developed by Hugo Santos. Its main features include:

 Extensible modular design
 MLDv1 and MLDv2 support
 PIM-SM support (ASM and SSM)
 Partial MBGP support
 Supports both native and virtual (tunnel) interfaces (tested IPv6-IPv4, IPv6-IPv6 and TUN/TAP tunnels)
 Abstract Multicast Forwarding Interface (MFA) with user-space forwarding
 CLI support (remote configuration and management) via telnet or local access

The project is unsupported since 2013. The author states as a reason that native multicast forwarding support is available in Linux since 2005 and pim6sd could be used to manage it.

See also 
 IP Multicast

References

External links
Source code on Github
Project Homepage (abandoned)

Routing